Cayana Airstrip  is an airstrip serving the villages around Kajana in the  Sipaliwini District of Suriname. The runway is just west of Kajana, across the Suriname River.

Airlines and destinations 
Airlines serving this airport are:

Accidents and incidents
 On June 18, 1982, Cessna U206G (PZ-TAC) from Gonini Air Service was damaged at the Cayana airstrip. The pilot was Mr. Kuiper, who escaped serious injuries.

See also
 List of airports in Suriname
 Transport in Suriname

References

External links
OpenStreetMap – Cajana
OurAirports – Cayana
Geoview Terminal

Airports in Suriname
Sipaliwini District